Paratrirhithrum is a genus of tephritid  or fruit flies in the family Tephritidae.

Species
The genus includes the following species.

 Paratrirhithrum nitidum
 Paratrirhithrum nitobae

References

Dacinae
Tephritidae genera